The Samsung Tower Palace is a group of seven towers, lettered A-G. They are located in Dogok-dong, Gangnam-gu, Seoul and South Korea. They range from 42 to 72 floors, all built between 2002 and 2004, and all used as luxury residential complexes. Tower Palace "G", which is 73 floors and 264 metres (866 feet) high, was the tallest building in Korea since 2004 but was surpassed by the Northeast Asia Trade Tower in 2009. Its shape is formed by three oval lobes joined together.

The builders of the Tower Palace installed high-tech security measures. Card keys issued to residents are required at all entrances and elevators. Each residence's entrance is accessed by either a key code or fingerprint identification.

Much within the buildings is highly automated. Everything from lighting, curtains, home networks and even washing machines can be pre-set to perform certain actions at a defined time or when a mode is activated from the control panels.  The entire home can be controlled through the owner's mobile phone.

A helipad is located on the roof of all buildings.

Tower Palace One
The first four skyscrapers (Tower A, Tower B, Tower C and Tower D) are collectively known as Tower Palace One.

References

External links
 Emporis.com - Tower Palace One, Tower B
 Emporis.com - Tower Palace One, Tower B
 Emporis.com - Tower Palace One, Tower B 

Tower Palace
Tower Palace
Buildings and structures in Gangnam District
Skyscrapers in Seoul
Residential buildings completed in 2004
2004 establishments in South Korea
Residential skyscrapers in South Korea